The SLS Hotel & Residences Brickell is a high rise building in the Brickell district of Miami, Florida. The project includes 450 condominium units in addition to the 133 room hotel. With the exception of a few penthouses, the project sold out before breaking ground. The project is located at 1300 South Miami Avenue, next to the Infinity at Brickell; it replaces the second phase of that project. There is another SLS-branded building a few blocks north known as SLS Lux.

See also
List of tallest buildings in Miami

References

External links
 
 SLS Brickell at Emporis

Buildings and structures in Miami
Residential skyscrapers in Miami
2016 establishments in Florida
Residential buildings completed in 2016
Residential condominiums in Miami